Herbert Vere Evatt,  (30 April 1894 – 2 November 1965) was an Australian politician and judge. He served as a judge of the High Court of Australia from 1930 to 1940, Attorney-General and Minister for External Affairs from 1941 to 1949, and leader of the Australian Labor Party (ALP) and Leader of the Opposition from 1951 to 1960. Evatt is considered one of Australia's most prominent public intellectuals of the twentieth century. 

Evatt was born in East Maitland, New South Wales, and grew up on Sydney's North Shore. He studied law at the University of Sydney, attaining the degree of Doctor of Laws (LL.D.) in 1924. After a period in the New South Wales Legislative Assembly (1925–1930), Evatt was appointed to the High Court in 1930 by the Scullin Government. He was 36 years old, and remains the youngest appointee in the court's history. He was considered an innovative judge, but left the court to seek election to federal parliament at the 1940 federal election.

In 1941, the ALP returned to government under Prime Minister John Curtin. Evatt was appointed Attorney-General and Minister for External Affairs, positions he held under Curtin and Ben Chifley until the government's defeat at the 1949 federal election. He served as President of the United Nations General Assembly from 1948 to 1949, and helped to draft the Universal Declaration of Human Rights. After Chifley's death in 1951, Evatt was elected as his successor as ALP leader. Internal tensions over the party's attitude to communism during the Cold War culminated in a party split in 1955. The ALP was defeated at three consecutive federal elections under Evatt's leadership, in 1954, 1955 and 1958. He faced three leadership spills before being convinced to retire from politics in 1960 and accept the post of Chief Justice of New South Wales.

Early life
Evatt was born on 30 April 1894 at the Bank Hotel in East Maitland, New South Wales. He was the fifth of eight sons born to Jane Sophia (known as "Jeanie") and John Ashmore Hamilton Evatt; two of his older brothers died in infancy. On his father's side, Evatt was descended from an Anglo-Irish family with a history of military service – his paternal grandfather was Captain George Evatt of the 70th (Surrey) Regiment of Foot, while an uncle was Major-General Sir George Evatt. His father was born in Cawnpore (now Kanpur), India, but grew up in Dublin, Ireland. He arrived in Australia at the age of 16, and eventually settled in Morpeth, where in 1882 he married Jeanie Gray, the daughter of a marine engineer from Sydney. Evatt's maternal grandfather was born in Shoreditch, London, England, while his maternal grandmother was born in County Limerick, Ireland. His parents – both Anglicans – moved to East Maitland in 1885, where they managed the Hunter River Hotel until 1891 and then took over the smaller Bank Hotel.

Evatt began his education at a local state school. His father suffered a protracted bout of ill health and died in October 1901, when his son was seven. The family stayed in Maitland for three more years, but eventually moved to Sydney to be closer to his mother's family, who lived on the North Shore. She bought a home in Milsons Point overlooking Sydney Harbour, within walking distance of her parents' home in Kirribilli. The house was later demolished to make way for the Sydney Harbour Bridge. Evatt was enrolled in the Fort Street Model School, located directly across the harbour on Observatory Hill. He attended the school from 1905 to 1911, in his final year serving as head prefect and captain of the cricket and rugby union teams. He finished second in the state senior examinations, and was dux of his school.

University
In 1912, Evatt began studying at the University of Sydney, where he was a resident of St Andrew's College. He graduated in 1919 with a Bachelor of Arts in Mathematics, Logic, Philosophy and English with (Triple) First-Class Honours and the University Medal in Philosophy in 1915, a Master of Arts in 1916, and a Bachelor of Laws with First-Class Honours and the University Medal in 1918. At university Evatt played cricket, rugby league football, hockey and baseball. He was also the Editor of Hermes, the annual student literary journal, was a Tutor at St Andrew's College, and the President of the University of Sydney Union from 1916–17. He graduated Legum Doctor (LLD) in 1924 from the University of Sydney with a thesis on the royal prerogative. Evatt remained involved with the university after his graduation, staying on as the patron of the University Amateur Rugby League club.

State politics
Because of poor eyesight, Evatt was unable to serve in the First World War, in which two of his brothers were killed. He became a prominent industrial lawyer in Sydney, working mainly for trade union clients. In 1925 Evatt was elected as an Australian Labor Party member for Balmain in the New South Wales Legislative Assembly. Re-elected as an "Independent Labor" candidate in 1927, Evatt served in the Legislative Assembly until 1930.

High Court (1930–1940)
In 1930 the Labor government headed by James Scullin appointed Evatt as the youngest-ever justice of the High Court of Australia. Regarded by some as a brilliant and innovative judge, he delivered a number of minority judgments, several of which were adopted by High Court majorities decades later. Evatt could, however, be partial on the bench. Sir Owen Dixon noted in Australian Woollen Mills Ltd v F.S. Walton & Co. Ltd (1937 58 CLR 641) that Evatt was on that occasion "full of antagonism to the respondent ... Most unjudicial." Whenever Evatt was not particularly interested in a case he appears to have generally gone along with Dixon.

Evatt was one of six justices of the High Court who had served in the Parliament of New South Wales, along with Edmund Barton, Richard O'Connor, Adrian Knox, Albert Piddington and Edward McTiernan. In 1934 Evatt played an important part in the Egon Kisch exclusion when he ruled that the Lyons Government's ban on Kisch entering Australia had been incorrectly executed and that Kisch was free to enter the country.

Federal politics
In 1940, Evatt resigned from the High Court to return to politics, and was elected federal MP for the Sydney seat of Barton in the House of Representatives. . When Labor came to power under John Curtin in 1941, Evatt became Attorney-General and Foreign Minister. He became deputy leader of the Labor Party after the 1946 election, under the leadership of Ben Chifley. 

While in London, Evatt acted as the spokesperson for the Australian Board of Control for International Cricket and made personal representations to the Marylebone Cricket Club who were reluctant to send a cricket team to tour Australia so soon after the war. He put forward convincing arguments as to the need to re-establish sporting relations and the financial benefits of the tour and the MCC agreed to the 1946–47 Ashes series. Don Bradman would later aver that the "quick resumption of Anglo-Australian Tests had justified itself in every way, psychologically, technically, financially".

Evatt was a defender of the White Australia Policy. There was a strong view in Australia that any softening of the White Australia stance might result in cheaper labour being imported from overseas. Another prevailing sentiment was that multiculturalism resulted in instability. Evatt, opposing resolutions which could have led to more Asian immigration to Australia, told the Chinese delegation at San Francisco: 
You have always insisted on the right to determine the composition of your own people. Australia wants that right now. What you are attempting to do now, Japan attempted after the last war [the First World War] and was prevented by Australia. Had we opened New Guinea and Australia to Japanese immigration then the Pacific War by now might have ended disastrously and we might have had another shambles like that experienced in Malaya.

President of the UN General Assembly

Evatt joined the diplomatic councils of the allies during World War II. In 1945, he played a leading role in the founding of the UN. He was President of the United Nations General Assembly from 1948 to 1949 as part of the third session of the United Nations General Assembly, and was prominent in the negotiations that led to the creation of Israel as chair of the Ad Hoc Committee on the Palestinian Question. He helped draft the United Nations Universal Declaration of Human Rights.

Leader of the Opposition (1951–1960)

In the 1949 election, Labor was defeated by Menzies' new Liberal Party. At this election, Evatt faced war hero Nancy Wake and suffered a massive swing in his own electorate, seeing his majority reduced from a very safe 66.9 percent to an extremely marginal 53.2 percent. He faced Wake again in the double dissolution election of 1951 and was nearly defeated, seeing her off by only 243 votes (out of more than 41,600 cast). When Ben Chifley (still Labor leader) suddenly died several months later, Evatt was elected unopposed as his successor. At first his leadership went well. He campaigned successfully against Menzies' attempt to amend the Constitution to ban the Communist Party. Many convinced anti-Communists in the Labor Party believed this was both bad politics and bad policy because of the active Communist infiltration of numerous trade unions, and because of the threat to national security posed by Communism. None of the anti-Communists, aside from Stan Keon, openly censured Evatt's stance. 

Evatt campaigned well in the 1954 election and came within four seats of defeating the Menzies government.  The Labor Party actually achieved a higher two-party-preferred vote in the election than the governing Liberal-Country Coalition, but the uneven distribution of votes meant that the Coalition retained more seats and were able to hold onto government. Evatt believed that the Petrov Affair, involving the defection of a Soviet diplomat and his wife during the election campaign, had been contrived through Menzies's conspiring with security services with the specific purpose of discrediting Evatt. In the ensuing Royal Commission on Espionage, documents tendered were alleged to provide evidence of an extensive Soviet spy ring in Australia, and named (among many others), two of Evatt's staff members. Evatt appeared before the Royal Commission as attorney for his staff members. His cross-examination of the key ASIO operative Michael Bialoguski transformed the commission's hearings and greatly perturbed the government. The Royal Commission quickly withdrew Evatt's leave to appear. Evatt claimed this denial was because of judicial bias in favour of the Menzies government. 

Evatt's loss of the election and his belief that Menzies had conspired with ASIO to contrive Petrov's defection led to criticism within the Labor Party of his decision to appear before the Royal Commission. He compounded this by writing to the Soviet Foreign Minister, Vyacheslav Molotov, asking if allegations of Soviet espionage in Australia were true. When Molotov replied, naturally denying the allegations, Evatt read the letter out in Parliament, bringing the House into silence momentarily before both sides of Parliament began laughing.

Evatt also blamed the Catholic-dominated "Groupers" in the Labor Party for sabotaging his election campaign. He later publicly attacked The Groupers, who had infiltrated the Victorian Labor Party, thus precipitating a split in the party, with most of the "Groupers" leaving or being expelled. The disaffected formed the Democratic Labor Party, which directed its preferences against Labor at subsequent elections. This, together with an obsessive hatred of Menzies, led Evatt into a number of unforced errors. Due to these factors, Labor was roundly defeated in the 1955 election, suffering an 11-seat swing. Evatt himself was nearly defeated in Barton after almost three-quarters of independents' preferences flowed to his Liberal opponent. For the 1958 election, he transferred to Hunter, one of the few safe country seats for Labor. He offered to resign as leader if the DLP would return to the party. The offer was rejected and Labor was soundly defeated again.

Chief Justice of New South Wales (1960–1962)
In 1960, the Labor government in New South Wales appointed Evatt the Chief Justice of New South Wales, an appointment that was widely seen as a means of giving him a dignified exit from politics.

Personal life

Two years after being admitted to the New South Wales Bar, Evatt, an Anglican, married Mary Alice Sheffer at the Congregational Church in Mosman, New South Wales on 27 November 1920. Even with his sometimes turbulent nature, the relationship was one of devotion. The couple had two children, Peter and Rosalind, whom they adopted due to Mary Alice's serious gynaeocological issues.

Peter Evatt became an Olympic rower, who was 1953 national sculling champion and represented Australia in rowing at the 1956 Olympic Games in Melbourne. Peter was a member of the ALP, like his father, and stood for the seat of Bennelong at the 1969 federal elections.

In 1972, aged 50, Peter died by accidental electrocution while trying to repair a faulty electric toaster. He was survived by his six children. His death was reported by The Age  on 27 December 1972.

In 1953, Rosalind Evatt married Peter Carrodus, the assistant manager of a Canberra radio station, 2CA.

Health
Recent biographies of Evatt agree that his behaviour became more eccentric from the late 1950s. Pat Fiske and David McKnight, in their 1995 television documentary Doc, attributed what they described as Evatt's "deteriorating mental functioning" to arteriosclerosis.

Relatives
Evatt's youngest brother was Clive R. Evatt, whose three children are noted below:

Evatt's niece, Penelope Seidler, an architect, married Harry Seidler in 1958.

Evatt's niece, Elizabeth Evatt, was a barrister and judge.

Evatt's nephew, Clive A. Evatt, was a defamation barrister.

Death
In 1962, Evatt was suffering from stress and was persuaded to retire from the bench. He also suffered from arteriosclerosis which contributed to his declining health. He died from pneumonia in Canberra on 2 November 1965, aged 71.

Literary works
During his life, Evatt had a varied career as a writer, covering such topics as law and labour history. His book on the politics of the Rum Rebellion is still considered relevant, although others disagree with Evatt's view. Evatt contributed an article on "Cricket and the British Commonwealth" to the 1949 edition of the Wisden Cricketer's Almanack.

His publications include:
H. V. Evatt, Australian Labour Leader: The Story Of W.A. Holman and the Labour Movement, 1954
H. V. Evatt, The King and His Dominion Governors, 1936
H. V. Evatt, Injustice within the Law. A study of the case of the Dorsetshire Labourers, 1937
H. V. Evatt, The Royal Prerogative, 1930 (this was his LLD thesis)
H. V. Evatt, Rum Rebellion: A Study of the Overthrow of Governor Bligh by John Macarthur and the New South Wales Corps, 1943

Honours
In 1924 Evatt was awarded the degree LLD, for his dissertation on prerogative powers of Governors in the British legal system.
The Evatt Foundation, a research institute for the labour movement, is named in his honour.
The suburb of Evatt, which lies in the Belconnen district of Canberra, Australian Capital Territory, is also named in his honour.
One of the high schools (Maitland Boys High School) in his home town of Maitland was briefly renamed Evatt High School in his honour, before being renamed Maitland High School when it became unisex some years later.
In November 1965, the NSW State Government opened Evatt Park in Lugarno, which is still used frequently for recreation.
United Nations Youth Australia runs an annual national high schools Model United Nations Security Council competition, the Evatt Cup, which has rounds in every state and territory.
Evatt was nominated for the Nobel Peace Prize in 1950 and 1953, but was not selected in both instances.

References

Bibliography
 available from Digital Print, South Australia.

Further reading
 Buckley, Ken; Dale, Barbara and Reynolds, Wayne. Doc Evatt, Cheshire, Melbourne (1994); 
 Dalziel, Allan. Evatt. The Enigma, Lansdowne Press, Melbourne (1967).
 Haigh, Gideon. The Brilliant Boy: Doc Evatt and the Great Australian Dissent, Simon and Schuster, Sydney (2021); 
 Hogan, Ashley. Moving in the Open Daylight: Doc Evatt, an Australian at the United Nations, Sydney University Press: Sydney, (2008); 
 Makin, Norman. Federal Labour Leaders, Union Printing, Sydney, New South Wales (1961), pp. 140–145.
 Murphy, John. Evatt: A Life, NewSouth Publishing, Sydney (2016) 
 Renouf, Alan. Let Justice Be Done. The Foreign Policy of Dr H.V. Evatt, University of Queensland Press, St Lucia, Queensland (1983); 
 Tennant, Kylie. Evatt. Politics and Justice, Angus and Robertson, Sydney (1970);

External links

 Evatt Collection at Flinders University Library
 
 

1894 births
1965 deaths
Attorneys-General of Australia
Australian Anglicans
Australian Labor Party members of the Parliament of Australia
Australian Leaders of the Opposition
Australian ministers for Foreign Affairs
Australian monarchists
Australian people of English descent
Australian people of Irish descent
Australian King's Counsel
Chief Justices of New South Wales
Judges of the Supreme Court of New South Wales
Justices of the High Court of Australia
Members of the Australian House of Representatives for Barton
Members of the Australian House of Representatives for Hunter
Members of the Australian House of Representatives
Members of the Cabinet of Australia
Members of the New South Wales Legislative Assembly
People educated at Fort Street High School
People from Maitland, New South Wales
Permanent Representatives of Australia to the United Nations
Presidents of the United Nations General Assembly
20th-century King's Counsel
Sydney Law School alumni
Leaders of the Australian Labor Party
20th-century Australian politicians
Australian members of the Privy Council of the United Kingdom